John Chin Young  容澤泉 (1909–1997) was a painter who was born in Honolulu, Hawaii on March 26, 1909.  He was the son of Chinese immigrants and began drawing at the age of eight, stimulated by Chinese calligraphy, which he learned in Chinese language school.  Young had his first and only art lessons while a student at President William McKinley High School in Honolulu.  Thereafter, his art was entirely self-taught.  Young is best known for his Zen-like depictions of horses (such as the untitled watercolor), paintings of children (such as Children on Carousel), and abstractions (such as Tantalus).  Over the years, he acquired an important collection of ancient Asian art, which he donated to the Honolulu Museum of Art and the University of Hawaii at Manoa as the John Young Museum.  John Chin Young died in 1997 at the age of 88.  His daughter Debbie Young is also a painter residing in Hawaii.

During his 60 years as a working artist, Young exhibited at the Corcoran Gallery in Washington, D.C., the Metropolitan Museum of Art and the San Francisco Museum of Art.  The Art Institute of Chicago, the Honolulu Museum of Art, the Los Angeles County Museum of Art, and the Santa Barbara Museum of Art (California) are among the public collections holding paintings by John Chin Young.

References
 Forbes, David W., Encounters with Paradise: Views of Hawaii and its People, 1778-1941, Honolulu Academy of Arts, 1992, 213-270.
 Haar, Francis and Neogy, Prithwish, Artists of Hawaii: Nineteen Painters and Sculptors, University of Hawaii Press, 1974, 144-150.
 Hartwell, Patricia L. (editor), Retrospective 1967-1987, Hawaii State Foundation on Culture and the Arts, Honolulu, Hawaii, 1987, p. 58
 Metropolitan Museum of Art, American Painting Today, Metropolitan Museum of Art, 1950.
 Morse, Morse (ed.), Honolulu Printmakers, Honolulu, HI, Honolulu Academy of Arts, 2003, pp. 33 & 42, 
 Papanikolas, Theresa and DeSoto Brown, Art Deco Hawai'i, Honolulu, Honolulu Museum of Art, 2014, p. 130
 Yim, Susan, John Young, The sketchbooks, Honolulu, John Young Foundation in association with Outreach College, University of Hawaii at Manoa, 1998.
 Yoshihara, Lisa A., Collective Visions, 1967-1997, Hawaii State Foundation on Culture and the Arts, Honolulu, Hawaii, 1997, 63.
 Young, John, John Young, A retrospective, Honolulu, Hawaii, Honolulu Academy of Arts, 1996.
 Young, John, Sketchbook in Bamboo Ridge: Journal of Hawai'i Literature and Arts, Winter, 1994, 81-86.

Footnotes

1909 births
1997 deaths
20th-century American painters
20th-century American male artists
American male painters
Painters from Hawaii
Artists from Honolulu
American artists of Chinese descent
Hawaii people of Chinese descent